The European Convention on the International Validity of Criminal Judgments is a 1970 treaty of the Council of Europe whereby the states that agree to the treaty recognise the validity of criminal judgments and sentences handed down in other states that have ratified the treaty. The treaty also allows penal sentences to be served in the country of a person's residence if both the sentencing country and the country of residence are parties to the treaty.

The Convention was concluded on the 25 May 1970 in The Hague, Netherlands. It entered into force on 26 July 1974. As of January 2020, it has been signed by 28 European states and ratified by 23 of them. The states that have signed but not ratified the Convention are Germany, Greece, Italy, Luxembourg, and Portugal.

The following states have ratified the Convention:

See also
List of Council of Europe treaties

External links
European Convention on the International Validity of Criminal Judgments, Council of Europe information page
Text
Signatures and ratifications

1970 in the Netherlands
International Validity of Criminal Judgments
Treaties concluded in 1970
Treaties entered into force in 1976
Treaties of Albania
Treaties of Austria
Treaties of Belgium
Treaties of Bulgaria
Treaties of Cyprus
Treaties of Denmark
Treaties of Estonia
Treaties of Georgia (country)
Treaties of Iceland
Treaties of Latvia
Treaties of Lithuania
Treaties of Moldova
Treaties of Montenegro
Treaties of the Netherlands
Treaties of Norway
Treaties of Romania
Treaties of San Marino
Treaties of Serbia
Treaties of Slovenia
Treaties of Spain
Treaties of Sweden
Treaties of Turkey
Treaties of Ukraine
Treaties extended to the Faroe Islands
Treaties extended to Bouvet Island
Treaties extended to Peter I Island
Treaties extended to Queen Maud Land
Mutual legal assistance treaties